Lanistes nasutus is a species of large freshwater snail, an aquatic gastropod mollusk with a gill and an operculum in the family Ampullariidae, the apple snails.

It is found in Malawi and Mozambique.

References

Ampullariidae
Taxonomy articles created by Polbot